Public health informatics has been defined as the systematic application of information and computer science and technology to public health practice, research, and learning.  It is one of the subdomains of health informatics.

Definition
Public health informatics is defined as the use of computers, clinical guidelines, communication and information systems, which apply to vast majority of public health, related professions, such as nursing, clinical/ hospital care/ public health and medical research.

United States

In developed countries like  the United States, public health informatics is practiced by individuals in public health agencies at the federal and state levels and in the larger local health jurisdictions.  Additionally, research and training in public health informatics takes place at a variety of academic institutions.

At the federal Centers for Disease Control and Prevention in US states like Atlanta, Georgia, the Public Health Surveillance and Informatics Program Office (PHSIPO) focuses on advancing the state of information science and applies digital information technologies to aid in the detection and management of diseases and syndromes in individuals and populations.

The bulk of the work of public health informatics in the United States, as with public health generally, takes place at the state and local level, in the state departments of health and the county or parish departments of health.  At a state health department the activities may include: collection and storage of vital statistics (birth and death records); collection of reports of communicable disease cases from doctors, hospitals, and laboratories, used for infectious disease surveillance; display of infectious disease statistics and trends; collection of child immunization and lead screening information; daily collection and analysis of emergency room data to detect early evidence of biological threats; collection of hospital capacity information to allow for planning of responses in case of emergencies.  Each of these activities presents its own information processing challenge.

Collection of public health data

(TODO: describe CDC-provided DOS/desktop-based systems like TIMSS (TB), STDMIS (Sexually transmitted  diseases); Epi-Info for epidemiology investigations; and others )

Since the beginning of the World Wide Web, public health agencies with sufficient information technology resources have been transitioning to web-based collection of public health data, and, more recently, to automated messaging of the same information.  In the years roughly 2000 to 2005 the Centers for Disease Control and Prevention, under its National Electronic Disease Surveillance System (NEDSS), built and provided free to states a comprehensive web and message-based reporting system called the NEDSS Base System (NBS).  Due to the funding being limited and it not being wise to have fiefdom-based systems, only a few states and larger counties have built their own versions of electronic disease surveillance systems, such as Pennsylvania's PA-NEDSS.  These do not provide timely full intestate notification services causing an increase in disease rates versus the NEDSS federal product.

To promote interoperability, the CDC has encouraged the adoption in public health data exchange of several standard vocabularies and messaging formats from the health care world. The most prominent of these are: the Health Level 7 (HL7) standards for health care messaging; the LOINC system for encoding laboratory test and result information; and the Systematized Nomenclature of Medicine (SNOMED) vocabulary of health care concepts.

Since about 2005, the CDC has promoted the idea of the Public Health Information Network to facilitate the transmission of data from various partners in the health care industry and elsewhere (hospitals, clinical and environmental laboratories, doctors' practices, pharmacies) to local health agencies, then to state health agencies, and then to the CDC.  At each stage the entity must be capable of receiving the data, storing it, aggregating it appropriately, and transmitting it to the next level.  A typical example would be infectious disease data, which hospitals, labs, and doctors are legally required to report to local health agencies; local health agencies must report to their state public health department; and which the states must report in aggregate form to the CDC.  Among other uses, the CDC publishes the Morbidity and Mortality Weekly Report (MMWR) based on these data acquired systematically from across the United States.

Major issues in the collection of public health data are: awareness of the need to report data; lack of resources of either the reporter or collector; lack of interoperability of data interchange formats, which can be at the purely syntactic or at the semantic level; variation in reporting requirements across the states, territories, and localities.

Public health informatics can be thought or divided into three categories.

Study models of different systems
The first category is to discover and study models of complex systems, such as disease transmission. This can be done through different types of data collections, such as hospital surveys, or electronic surveys submitted to the organization (such as the CDC). Transmission rates or disease incidence rates/surveillance can be obtained through government organizations, such as the CDC, or global organizations, such as WHO. Not only disease transmission/rates can be looked at. Public health informatics can also delve into people with/without health insurance and the rates at which they go to the doctor. Before the advent of the internet, public health data in the United States, like other healthcare and business data, were collected on paper forms and stored centrally at the relevant public health agency.  If the data were to be computerized they required a distinct data entry process, were stored in the various file formats of the day and analyzed by mainframe computers using standard batch processing.

Storage of public health data

The second category is to find ways to improve the efficiency of different public health systems. This is done through various collections methods, storage of data and how the data is used to improve current health problems. In order to keep everything standardized, vocabulary and word usage needs to be consistent throughout all systems. Finding new ways to link together and share new data with current systems is important to keep everything up to date.

Storage of public health data shares the same data management issues as other industries.  And like other industries, the details of how these issues play out are affected by the nature of the data being managed.

Due to the complexity and variability of public health data, like health care data generally, the issue of data modeling presents a particular challenge.  While a generation ago flat data sets for statistical analysis were the norm, today's requirements of interoperability and integrated sets of data across the public health enterprise require more sophistication.  The relational database is increasingly the norm in public health informatics.  Designers and implementers of the many sets of data required for various public health purposes must find a workable balance between very complex and abstract data models such as HL7's Reference Information Model (RIM) or CDC's Public Health Logical Data Model, and simplistic, ad hoc models that untrained public health practitioners come up with and feel capable of working with.

Due to the variability of the incoming data to public health jurisdictions, data quality assurance is also a major issue.

Analysis of public health data

Finally, the last category can be thought as maintaining and enriching current systems and models to adapt to overflow of data and storing/sorting of this new data. This can be as simple as connecting directly to an electronic data collection source, such as health records from the hospital, or can go public information (CDC) about disease rates/transmission. Finding new algorithms that will sort through large quantities of data quickly and effectively is necessary as well.

The need to extract usable public health information from the mass of data available requires the public health informaticist to become familiar with a range of analysis tools, ranging from business intelligence tools to produce routine or ad hoc reports, to sophisticated statistical analysis tools such as DAP/SAS and PSPP/SPSS, to Geographical Information Systems (GIS) to expose the geographical dimension of public health trends. Such analyses usually require methods that appropriately secure the privacy of the health data. One approach is to separate the individually identifiable variables of the data from the rest

Applications in health surveillance and epidemiology

There are a few organizations out there that provide useful information for those professionals that want to be more involved in public health informatics. Such as the American Medical Informatics Association (AMIA). AMIA is for professions that are involved in health care, informatics research, biomedical research, including physicians, scientists, researchers, and students. The main goals of AMIA are to move from ‘bench to bedside’, help improve the impact of health innovations and advance the public health informatics field. They hold annual conferences, online classes and webinars, which are free to their members. There is also a career center specific for the biomedical and health informatics community.

Many jobs or fellowships in public health informatics are offered. The CDC (Center for Disease Control) has various fellowship programs, while multiple colleges/companies offer degree programs or training in this field.

For more information on these topics, follow the links below:

http://www.jhsph.edu/departments/health-policy-and-management/certificates/public-health-informatics/what-is-health-informatics.html

https://web.archive.org/web/20150406033743/http://www.phii.org/what-we-do

 SAPPHIRE (Health care) or Situational Awareness and Preparedness for Public Health Incidences and Reasoning Engines is a semantics-based health information system capable of tracking and evaluating situations and occurrences that may affect public health.

Social media analytics

Since the late 2000s, data from social media websites such as Twitter and Facebook, as well as search engines such as Google and Bing, have been used extensively in detecting trends in public health.

References

 Public Health Informatics and Information Systems by  Patrick W. O’Carroll, William A. Yasnoff, M. Elizabeth Ward, Laura H. Ripp, Ernest L. Martin, D.A. Ross, A.R. Hinman, K. Saarlas, William H. Foege (Hardcover - Oct 16, 2002)  
 A Vision for More Effective Public Health Information Technology on SSRN
 Olmeda, Christopher J. (2000). Information Technology in Systems of Care. Delfin Press. 
 https://www.fda.gov/fdac/features/596_info.html on FDA
 Health Data Tools and Statistics

Public health